Guptilčiai (formerly Guptelčiai, Gūptelčiai) is a village in Kėdainiai district municipality, in Kaunas County, in central Lithuania. According to the 2011 census, the village had a population of 38 people.

Guptilčiai village is known since 1593 (there were 4 voloks of land). It was split into single homesteads in 1932.

Demography

References

Villages in Kaunas County
Kėdainiai District Municipality